The 1981 IIHF European U18 Championship was the fourteenth playing of the IIHF European Junior Championships.

Group A
Played in Minsk, Belorussian SSR, USSR from April 2–8, 1981.

First round
Group 1

Group 2

Final round 

Championship round

Placing round

Austria was relegated to Group B for 1982.

Tournament Awards
Top Scorer: Oleg Znarok and Vladimír Růžička (16 points)
Top Goalie: Jakob Gustavsson
Top Defenceman:Antonín Stavjaňa
Top Forward: Leonid Trukhno

Group B
Played in Miercurea Ciuc Romania from March 15–21, 1981.

First round
Group 1

Group 2

Final round

Championship round

Placing round

France was promoted to Group A, and Hungary was demoted to group C, for 1982.

Group C
Played in Belgium and the Netherlands from March 19–24, 1981.

The Netherlands were promoted to Group B for 1982.

References

Complete results

Junior
IIHF European Junior Championship tournament
April 1981 sports events in Europe
Sports competitions in Minsk
1980s in Minsk
1981 in Belarus
Junior
International ice hockey competitions hosted by the Soviet Union
Miercurea Ciuc
March 1981 sports events in Europe
International ice hockey competitions hosted by Romania
International ice hockey competitions hosted by Belgium
International ice hockey competitions hosted by the Netherlands
Junior
Junior
Junior